Săsciori is a commune located in Alba County, Transylvania, Romania. It is composed of nine villages: Căpâlna (Sebeskápolna), Dumbrava (Sebeskákova), Laz (Sebesláz), Loman (Lomány), Pleși (Plesitelep), Răchita (Rekitta), Săsciori, Sebeșel (Sebeshely), and Tonea (Toneatelep).

The commune lies in the southwestern reaches of the Transylvanian Plateau, on the banks of the river Sebeș.

Săsciori is crossed by national road Transalpina (DN67C), which starts in Sebeș and runs due south over the Parâng Mountains to Novaci, in Gorj County.

At the 2011 census, the commune had a population of 5,757, of which 95.73% were ethnic Romanians.

Căpâlna village is the site of the Dacian fortress of Căpâlna.

References

Communes in Alba County
Localities in Transylvania